Chansol is a village in Kheralu Taluka in Mahesana district of Gujarat State, India.

History 

The temple of Shebhar Gog Maharaj is located at a distance of 3 km from this village, a folk fair is held here on the day of Sud Punam. 
The temple is located in the middle of the mountains, from which the river flows.

Sub Village

Laxmipura

Population

Hospital

Police station 

There are one Police stations in Chansol: City Police Station (Center Kheralu)

References

Villages in Mehsana district